Sherry Block (born February 10, 1971) is an American archer. She competed in the women's individual and team events at the 1992 Summer Olympics.

References

External links
 

1971 births
Living people
American female archers
Olympic archers of the United States
Archers at the 1992 Summer Olympics
Sportspeople from Denver
21st-century American women